Ibrahim Ameer is a Maldivian politician. He is the current finance minister of the Maldives.

References

Living people
Year of birth missing (living people)
Finance ministers of the Maldives
University of Nebraska Omaha alumni